Offer Assistant was a browser-based password, finance, and promotional offers manager for Internet Explorer and Firefox. It was certified by TRUSTe, VeriSign, and Softpedia. It was featured at Visa, Wells Fargo, Bank of America, Target, and Netspend. Offer Assistant was featured in PC Magazine with a four-star rating, as an Editor's Choice, and reviewed on Download.com, Makeuseof, Lifehacker, and BestFreewareDownload.

Awards

Webby Award Nominee for Banking/Bill Paying website in the 2009 13th Annual Webby Awards
The American Business Awards – Stevie Awards finalist in 2009 for Best ecommerce site
Interactive Media Awards 2008 - Outstanding Achievement in Financial Services

See also

 Comparison of password managers
 List of password managers
 Password manager
 Cryptography

References

External links
 

Password managers
Cryptographic software
Internet Explorer add-ons
Nonfree Firefox legacy extensions